Jeong Jiyong Literature Prize (Hangul: 정지용문학상) is a literary award established in 1989 for poet and poetry (hangul: 시와 시학)' to commemorate the literary achievements of Jeong Jiyong.
It selects the best poem of the year written by poets of medium standing. It awards the best poem based on how excellent and how easy to recite the poem is.

Winners

References

South Korean literary awards
Poetry awards
Awards established in 1989